Pirongia is a small town in the Waipa District of the Waikato region of New Zealand's North Island. It is 12 kilometres to the west of Te Awamutu, on the banks of the Waipā River, close to the foot of the 962 metre Mount Pirongia, which lies in Pirongia Forest Park to the west of the town.

Pirongia was originally named Alexandra, after the English Princess of Wales, but to avoid confusion with the town of that name in the South Island the name was changed to Pirongia. Some of the village's businesses and organisations such as the Alexandra Hotel and the Alexandra Racing Club retain the earlier name. Alexandra Racing Club, established in 1866, is reputed to be the second oldest racing club in New Zealand.

History

Early history

At the northern end of the town, between the Waipā River and the Mangapiko Stream, is the site of Mātakitaki pā. This was the location of a Māori battle in May 1822 between invading musket-armed Ngāpuhi led by Hongi Hika and defending Waikato led by Pōtatau Te Wherowhero, during the musket wars.

Pirongia was sited where it is because of its proximity to the Aukati (the confiscation line along the Puniu River) and because in those days this was as far up the Waipā River that river steamers, supplying the new frontier settlements, could safely travel. As a result, Pirongia (Alexandra) was planned to be the hub servicing several redoubt settlements in the area. A large settlement was envisaged and 800 town sections were surveyed. Initially, there were two military redoubts here on the east and west sides of the river. Later a third Armed Constabulary Redoubt was constructed to replace the other two. The Armed Constabulary redoubt site can be viewed on Bellot Street and the site of the military redoubt is on Aubin  Close. The AC Redoubt is well preserved and is protected by the Historic Places Trust.

19th century

Pirongia remained of strategic importance until 1881 when King Tāwhiao and his followers symbolically laid down their arms near the intersection of Crozier and Franklin Streets and declared peace, signaling an end to the armed conflict.

Initially, the settlement prospered. In its heyday of the mid-1870s, there were two hotels, a variety of shops, a bank, a blacksmith, a lending library, a school and later a creamery, mainly on Crozier and Franklin Streets.

However, the decision to route the main trunk railway via Te Awamutu, and the resulting gradual decline in the importance of river transport, together with the dispersal from the King Country of King Tāwhiao and his followers, meant that by the 1890s, Pirongia (Alexandra) was being superseded by Te Awamutu and other settlements on the railway line. One solution which was surveyed was a light railway, but an election in 1923 saw the scheme dropped. Many businesses moved to Te Awamutu or closed and the settlement gradually assumed the character of a small farming centre.

Modern history

The village has experienced rapid population growth since the 1980s as city-dwellers seeking a rural lifestyle have migrated to Pirongia. This has changed the town's character from rural to suburban in a short period of time.

Pirongia has a rural fire force located in the village to protect native bush in the area. The rural fire force has a specialised off-road appliance designed for tough off-road terrain.

Pirongia Rugby Club has strong teams in the Waikato competition.

Pirongia is also home to Pirongia Clydesdale horses regularly seen at public events throughout the countryside.

The Pirongia Heritage and Information Centre (Te Whare Taonga O Ngaa Rohe o Arekahana)  has displays and items of historical interest and is located on Franklin Street in the centre of the village.

The local Pūrekireki Marae is a meeting place for the Ngāti Maniapoto hapū of Apakura and Hikairo, and the Waikato Tainui hapū of Apakura. It includes the Marutehiakina meeting house.

Demographics

Pirongia had a population of 1,224 at the 2018 New Zealand census, an increase of 102 people (9.1%) since the 2013 census, and an increase of 177 people (16.9%) since the 2006 census. There were 432 households, comprising 594 males and 633 females, giving a sex ratio of 0.94 males per female. The median age was 42.1 years (compared with 37.4 years nationally), with 291 people (23.8%) aged under 15 years, 168 (13.7%) aged 15 to 29, 579 (47.3%) aged 30 to 64, and 186 (15.2%) aged 65 or older.

Ethnicities were 91.9% European/Pākehā, 14.0% Māori, 1.2% Pacific peoples, 1.0% Asian, and 1.7% other ethnicities. People may identify with more than one ethnicity.

The percentage of people born overseas was 15.7, compared with 27.1% nationally.

Although some people chose not to answer the census's question about religious affiliation, 57.8% had no religion, 30.1% were Christian, 0.7% had Māori religious beliefs and 1.7% had other religions.

Of those at least 15 years old, 195 (20.9%) people had a bachelor's or higher degree, and 159 (17.0%) people had no formal qualifications. The median income was $35,100, compared with $31,800 nationally. 189 people (20.3%) earned over $70,000 compared to 17.2% nationally. The employment status of those at least 15 was that 474 (50.8%) people were employed full-time, 159 (17.0%) were part-time, and 24 (2.6%) were unemployed.

Education

The school was founded in 1873.

See also

References

External links 

 1865 map

Populated places in Waikato
Waipa District